The Columbia Years 1943–1952: The V-Discs is a 1994 compilation album by the American singer Frank Sinatra. It was released as a "long box" box set in 1994 and re-released in a jewel box size in 1998.

The two-CD set contains recordings from V-Discs that were sent to troops during World War II. The V-Discs were the only recordings that the musician's union allowed Sinatra to record during the session musicians strike between 1942 and 1944 and he took full advantage, knowing that although the records would not be sold, it would keep him in the public ear, and allow him to perfect his technique.

Although a heavy set, it does not contain every V-disc Sinatra recorded. A more complete set would not become available until 2003 with the release of The Real Complete Columbia Years V-Discs.

Track listing

Disc One

Disc Two

Personnel
 Frank Sinatra – Vocals, all tracks
 The Bobby Tucker Singers – vocals, Disc 1 tracks 1, 6, & 12
 Raymond Paige and his orchestra – music, Disc 2 tracks 3-6
 The Pied Pipers (June Hutton, Hal Hopper, Chuck Lowry, Clark Yocum) – vocals, Disc 2 tracks 13 & 16
 Tommy Dorsey – trombone, "I'll Never Smile Again"
 Dinah Shore – vocal duet, Disc 2 tracks 10 & 20
 Axel Stordahl
Disc 1: arranger, all tracks except tracks 5 & 7; conductor, all tracks
Disc 2: arranger & conductor, tracks 1, 2, 7-12, 14-26
 Alec Wilder – arranger, Disc 1 tracks 5 & 7

References

 Liner Notes, The V-Discs: The Columbia Years 1943-1952, Columbia Records, 1994.

1998 compilation albums
Frank Sinatra compilation albums
American Forces Network